Pascal Lochard (born September 17, 1990) is a Canadian football running back for the Edmonton Eskimos of the Canadian Football League (CFL). He was drafted by the BC Lions in the second round of the 2014 CFL Draft. He played CIS football at Laval University. He has also been a member of the Winnipeg Blue Bombers and Ottawa Redblacks.

College career
Lochard was named the most valuable player of the 49th Vanier Cup, winning the Ted Morris Memorial Trophy.

Professional career

BC Lions
Lochard was selected by the BC Lions with the fourteenth pick in the 2014 CFL Draft.

Winnipeg Blue Bombers
Lochard signed with the Winnipeg Blue Bombers on February 9, 2016.

Ottawa Redblacks
Upon entering 2017 free agency, Lochard signed a two-year contract with the Ottawa Redblacks. He was released by the Redblacks on May 8, 2017.

Edmonton Eskimos
Lochard was signed by the Edmonton Eskimos on May 26, 2017.

References

External links
Ottawa Redblacks bio
BC Lions profile 

 

Living people
1990 births
Canadian football running backs
Laval Rouge et Or football players
BC Lions players
Winnipeg Blue Bombers players
Ottawa Redblacks players
Players of Canadian football from Quebec
Canadian football people from Montreal
Edmonton Elks players